The 3rd constituency of Martinique is a French legislative constituency in the Martinique département.  It consists of the commune of Fort-de-France, the capital of Martinique. In every election of the Fifth Republic, with the exception of the 2002 legislative election, it has returned a member of the Martinican Progressive Party.

Deputies

Election results

2022

 
 
|-
| colspan="8" bgcolor="#E9E9E9"|
|-

2017

2012
In the National Assembly election system, a candidate is elected in the first round if he or she obtains an absolute majority of the vote in his or her constituency and the votes of at least one quarter of all registered voters in the constituency. If many voters abstain, an absolute majority of the vote may thus not be enough, although this rarely happens. In the 2012 election, this constituency provided a surprising example of this.  Incumbent MP Serge Letchimy of the Martinican Progressive Party received 63.29% of the vote, but narrowly failed to be immediately elected due to a very low turnout (30.67%).

References

3